The 2002 edition of R League was held from April 4 to November 7, 2002. It was the first year in which Gwangju Sangmu Bulsajo participated.

Anyang LG Cheetahs won the competition for the second time by defeating Seongnam Ilhwa Chunma in final on 7 November 2002.

League standing

Central League

Southern League

Championship playoff

External links
 R League 2002 result (partial)

R League seasons
2002 in South Korean football